The Martin House is a historic mansion in Wartrace, Tennessee, U.S..

History
The house was built in 1809 for Barclay and Matthew Martins, two brothers from South Carolina who had served in the American Revolutionary War. They lived here with their wives, both cousins of Henry Clay. Matthew Martin and his wife Sally had 13 children; their son Matt served as a colonel in the Confederate States Army during the American Civil War.

Architectural significance
The house was designed in the Federal architectural style. It has been listed on the National Register of Historic Places since April 14, 1972.

References

Houses on the National Register of Historic Places in Tennessee
Federal architecture in Tennessee
Houses completed in 1809
Buildings and structures in Bedford County, Tennessee